Cerithium lifuense is a species of sea snail, a marine gastropod mollusk in the family Cerithiidae.

Description

Distribution
The distribution of Cerithium lifuense includes the Western Pacific.
 Taiwan
 Philippines
 Indonesia

References

External links

Cerithiidae
Gastropods described in 1895